Scaphinotus snowi is a species of ground beetle in the family Carabidae. It is found in North America.

Subspecies
These two subspecies belong to the species Scaphinotus snowi:
 Scaphinotus snowi roeschkei Van Dyke, 1907
 Scaphinotus snowi snowi (LeConte, 1881)

References

Further reading

 

Carabinae
Articles created by Qbugbot
Beetles described in 1881